Yoonjung Kang is a Korean linguist and Professor of Linguistics at the University of Toronto. She is known for her works on phonetics and phonology and is an editor of the journal Phonology.
She is a member of editorial boards of Studies in Phonetics, Phonology and Morphology, Language and Research and Korean Linguistics.

References

External links
Yoonjung Kang

phonologists
Living people
Year of birth missing (living people)
Linguistics journal editors
Linguists from Korea
Academic staff of the University of Toronto
Massachusetts Institute of Technology alumni
Stony Brook University faculty